The Martial Arts History Museum is a  museum in America devoted to the history of martial arts located in Burbank, California. It was created as an educational facility teaching young people and visitors about art, culture and tradition and how Asian history became part of American history through the martial arts. The Martial Arts History Museum is divided into several sections including China, Japan, Korea, Thailand, the Philippines, Hawaii, Anime and Media.

History 

The museum was started by Michael Matsuda, a 20-year contributing editor for Inside Kung fu and Black Belt magazine and one-time founder of Martial Art Magazine. He is a master of Monkey Kung Fu, and has been practicing various martial arts forms since 1968.

The Martial Arts History Museum launched its website in 1999 and later began hosting annual Hall of Fame ceremonies. Becoming a non-profit 501(c)(3) organization, the Martial Arts History Museum took to the road as a traveling exhibit and traveled from as far south as San Diego to as far north as New Jersey. After six years of attending expos, anime festivals, martial arts tournaments, Asian shows, etc., the Martial Arts History Museum began operating out of a permanent site in Santa Clarita, California in 2006. In 2010, the Martial Arts History Museum relocated to the city of Burbank, CA and reopened its doors to the public on June 25, 2011.

The Martial Arts History Museum provides a series of annual documented historical publications that serve as a reference books for martial arts history. These include the history of the martial arts, the origin of the museum, the official Martial Arts Hall of Fame

Exhibits 
The Martial Arts History Museum has exhibits covering a wide variety of martial arts and the countries from which each evolved. There are displays relating to kung fu, samurai, ninja, karate,  judo, Hawaiian Lua, Filipino kali and Thailand's Muay Thai including the weaponry used in each discipline.

A Media Room displays objects of martial arts movie and television memorabilia, including  the real gopher chucks used by Steve Oedekerk in the film, "Kung Pow! Enter the Fist," the actual headband used by Ralph Macchio in "The Karate Kid," the demon mask from "Revenge of the Ninja," the uniform from "Wendy Wu," and an animatronic character just installed.  As part of an easy to follow self-guided tour, each section contains a  video highlighting the impact of Asian culture on American history. In 2015, the museum introduced their latest exhibit, The History of Anime,  which includes Hong Kong Phooey. The museum regularly holds a number of monthly events including book fairs, sword cutting demonstrations, movie premieres, sushi seminars, first aid workshops, blood drives, history lessons, basic language classes, Asian musical performances, martial arts demonstrations and self-defense for women workshops.

References

External links 
 

Art museums and galleries in Los Angeles
Martial arts culture
Buildings and structures in Burbank, California
Sports museums in California
Museums in Los Angeles County, California
Education in Los Angeles County, California
Asian art museums in California
Asian-American art
History museums in California
Museums in Los Angeles
Ethnic museums in California
Museums established in 1999
1999 establishments in California